Waubay is a city in Day County, South Dakota, United States. The population was 473 at the 2020 census.

Waubay had its start in the early 1880s when the railroad was extended to that point.

The school district is Waubay Public 18-3. The local newspaper is the oldest business in town, called the Waubay Clipper.

Geography
Waubay is located at  (45.333174, -97.304192).

Demographics

2010 census
As of the census of 2010, there were 576 people, 242 households, and 148 families residing in the city. The racial makeup of the city was 59.9% White, 36.5% Native American, 0.3% Asian, and 3.3% from two or more races. Hispanic or Latino of any race were 2.3% of the population.

There were 242 households, of which 30.2% had children under the age of 18 living with them, 38.0% were married couples living together, 16.5% had a female householder with no husband present, 6.6% had a male householder with no wife present, and 38.8% were non-families. 34.7% of all households were made up of individuals, and 17.4% had someone living alone who was 65 years of age or older. The average household size was 2.38 and the average family size was 3.05.

The median age in the city was 43.1 years. 26.6% of residents were under the age of 18; 6.6% were between the ages of 18 and 24; 20.1% were from 25 to 44; 26.1% were from 45 to 64; and 20.5% were 65 years of age or older. The gender makeup of the city was 49.0% male and 51.0% female.

2000 census
As of the census of 2000, there were 662 people, 275 households, and 168 families residing in the city. The population density was 454.0 people per square mile (175.1/km2). There were 389 housing units at an average density of 266.8 per square mile (102.9/km2). The racial makeup of the city was 71.45% White, 25.23% Native American, 0.15% Pacific Islander, and 3.17% from two or more races. Hispanic or Latino of any race were 1.06% of the population.

There were 275 households, out of which 26.2% had children under the age of 18 living with them, 44.7% were married couples living together, 11.6% had a female householder with no husband present, and 38.9% were non-families. 34.5% of all households were made up of individuals, and 19.6% had someone living alone who was 65 years of age or older. The average household size was 2.38 and the average family size was 3.06.

In the city, the population was spread out, with 28.4% under the age of 18, 5.4% from 18 to 24, 19.6% from 25 to 44, 22.4% from 45 to 64, and 24.2% who were 65 years of age or older. The median age was 43 years. For every 100 females, there were 88.6 males. For every 100 females age 18 and over, there were 78.9 males.

The median income for a household in the city was $25,395, and the median income for a family was $30,833. Males had a median income of $26,528 versus $18,281 for females. The per capita income for the city was $15,746. About 19.5% of families and 27.6% of the population were below the poverty line, including 37.7% of those under age 18 and 21.1% of those age 65 or over.

References

Cities in Day County, South Dakota
Cities in South Dakota
Populated places established in 1895
1895 establishments in South Dakota